Saransk Airport  is an international airport in Mordovia, Russia located 7 km southeast of Saransk. It serves small airliners, but has undergone a major renovation in 2017 in time for the 2018 FIFA World Cup.

History
Since the second half of the 1940s, the Lyambir military airfield was used as an airport. In 1955, a civil airport was built in the city limits, in the area of what is nowadays Gagarin Street.

And in 1960, a new airport was opened in its current place, near the village of Lukhovka, 5 km south-east of Saransk city center. In 1964, a new terminal was built. In 1981, a concrete runway was commissioned, which allowed the airport to accept modern turbojet Tu-134 and Yak-42 aircraft. In 1988, the airport reached its peak: the number of take-offs reached 14 thousand flights a year. Following the dissolution of the Soviet Union the number of flights decreased. The airport was not subject to privatization and is fully owned by the unitary enterprise Administration of Civil Airports.

In 2014, the concept of modernization was defined: the runway extension, the demolition of the existing terminal and its replacement by a new one. In 2015, the airport was given the status of an international airport as part of the preparations for hosting the 2018 FIFA World Cup, which also includes reconstruction of the airport in order to accommodate traffic expected for the World Cup matches that will take place in Saransk. Reconstruction started on 1 January 2017. The runway was extended from 2,801 to 3,221 meters and reinforced with asphalt concrete. The airport is now able to receive such aircraft as the Boeing 737 and Airbus A320. Also new taxiways, air traffic control facilities had been built and the apron had been expanded. A new permanent domestic passenger terminal with an area of 7,000 square meters had been built with capacity of 300 passengers per hour. It was designed by FGUP GPI and NII GA Aeroproject (Moscow). In addition a temporary, a temporary international terminal was built, which will increase the capacity to 600 passengers per hour, for the time of the 2018 World Cup, and which will be dismantled after it.

The airport was opened after renovation on 1 February 2018 with the participation of Ministry Russian Minister Transport, Maksim Sokolov.

Airlines and destinations

Transportation
The airport is located 7 km south-east of the city center.

 there is public transportation service to/from the airport by bus and taxi.

Statistics

References

External links

Saransk Airport Homepage 

Airports built in the Soviet Union
Airports in Mordovia